Shirokov is a rural locality (a khutor) in Fastovskoye Rural Settlement, Ilovlinsky District, Volgograd Oblast, Russia. The population was 129 as of 2010. There are 6 streets.

Geography 
Shirokov is located in steppe, on the right bank of the Talovaya River, on the Volga Upland, 48 km southeast of Ilovlya (the district's administrative centre) by road. Fastov is the nearest rural locality.

References 

Rural localities in Ilovlinsky District